Alberto Carrieri (October 16, 1919 – May 23, 2002) was an Italian-American film and television actor. He was perhaps best known for playing "Pedro Quinn" in the 1983 film Scarface, with also being known for playing the role of "Captain Jacques Tremaine" in the 1965 film Major Dundee.

Life and career
Carrier was born in Italy. He began his career in 1950, where he appeared in five Mexican films. He then moved to Hollywood, California to appear in films. In 1958, Carrier co-starred in the film Desert Hell, where he played the role of "Sgt St. Clair". He appeared in films such as: Two Weeks in Another Town, The Secret Life of an American Wife, Fitzwilly, Thoroughly Modern Millie, Do Not Disturb, Tender Is the Night, Thunder in the Sun and Moment to Moment.

Carrier also appeared in numerous television programs. In 1963, he played the uncredited role of the Paris policeman "Gendarme" in the film A New Kind of Love.

Filmography

References

External links 

Rotten Tomatoes profile

1919 births
2002 deaths
Italian male film actors
Italian male television actors
Mexican male film actors
Mexican male television actors
American male film actors
American male television actors
20th-century Italian male actors
20th-century Mexican male actors
20th-century American male actors
Italian emigrants to Mexico
Italian emigrants to the United States